Itimi Dickson Edherefe is a Singapore international former football player.

Club career
Previously, Dickson played for Jurong FC, Woodlands Wellington FC, Young Lions and Persitara Jakarta Utara.

In 2001, Dickson was suspended for three months and fined S$1,000 for punching Home United's Harun Juma'at. He fell out with head coach V. Sundramoorthy after serving out his ban and was transferred to Woodlands Wellington in 2002.

Dickson returned to S-league to play for Home United after an unsuccessful season with Persitara Jakarta Utara. The final club he played was for Persidafon Dafonsoro.

After his retirement in 2012, Dickson joined the coaching staff at the private league ESPZEN.

International career
Fast and aggressive in attack, Dickson provides width and decent flair to a Singapore national side midfield that lacks technical capability.

Although he was born in Nigeria, Dickson received Singapore citizenship under the Foreign Sports Talent Scheme in 2004. He was on the Singapore squad that won the Tiger Cup regional football championship in 2004.

Dickson was given a 6-month ban from representing Singapore when he was absent from training with the national team in 2007. He later bounced back from the ban by playing well in league and was subsequently made part of the AFF Championship winning side.

National team career statistics

Goals for Senior National Team

Honours

International
Singapore
ASEAN Football Championship: 2004, 2007

References

1983 births
Living people
Nigerian footballers
Singaporean footballers
Singapore international footballers
Geylang International FC players
Woodlands Wellington FC players
Home United FC players
Singapore Premier League players
Nigerian emigrants to Singapore
Naturalised citizens of Singapore
Singaporean expatriate footballers
Expatriate footballers in Indonesia
Singaporean expatriate sportspeople in Indonesia
Persidafon Dafonsoro players
Liga 1 (Indonesia) players
Association football midfielders
Association football forwards
Jurong FC players
Young Lions FC players
Footballers at the 2006 Asian Games
Asian Games competitors for Singapore